Rampart may refer to:

 Rampart (fortification), a defensive wall or bank around a castle, fort or settlement

Rampart may also refer to:

 "O'er the Ramparts We Watched" is a key line from "The Star-Spangled Banner", the national anthem of the United States of America
 LAPD Rampart Division, a division of the Los Angeles Police Department
 Rampart scandal, a blanket term for the widespread corruption of the Rampart Division
 Ramparts (magazine), a leftist American magazine that was published from 1962 through 1975
 Rampart Search and Rescue, Adams County, Colorado
 RampART Social Center, an anti-authoritarian social centre in Whitechapel, East London UK
 Apache Rampart module, a module from the Apache Software Foundation for Web Services security
 Rampart High School, a National School of Excellence in Colorado Springs, Colorado
 Ramparts (Lille Gate) Commonwealth War Graves Commission Cemetery in the Ypres Salient, Belgium
 RAMPART-A, a secret signals intelligence program led by the United States National Security Agency

Places 
 Ramparts of Quebec City, the only remaining fortified city walls in the Americas north of Mexico
 The Ramparts (Mackenzie River), 12 km of rapids on the Mackenzie River
 Rampart, Alaska, a village
 Rampart Airport, near the village
 Rampart Canyon (Alaska), on the Yukon River, named for the village
 Rampart Dam, a canceled hydroelectric power project for Rampart Canyon
 Rampart, California, in Placer County
 Rampart, Los Angeles, California, in Los Angeles County
 Rampart crater, a type of crater on Mars
 The Ramparts (Canada), a mountain range in the Canadian Rockies
 Rampart Street in New Orleans, Louisiana
 Rampart Range, the region of mountains between Colorado Springs and Denver in Colorado

Entertainment 
 Rampart (video game), a 1990 action/strategy game
 Rampart (film), a 2011 film directed by Oren Moverman
 Rampart Records, see Eddie Davis (producer) (East L.A.)
 Rampart General Hospital, the fictional hospital of the Emergency! television series
 Rampart, a character in the Sovereign Seven comic book series
 Rampart Casino, at The Resort at Summerlin
 "Ramparts", instrumental from the 2001 album To Record Only Water for Ten Days by John Frusciante
 "Ramparts", from the 2003 album Zitilites by Danish rock band Kashmir
 Rampart, a town in the game Heroes of Might and Magic III
Rampart, a character in the game Apex Legends
 Rampart (G.I. Joe), a fictional character in the G.I. Joe universe

Sports 
 Quebec Remparts, a Canadian junior ice hockey team
 Rampart Stakes, a thoroughbred horse race